This is a list of Jain ascetics. The list include the names of ascetics who are known for their contributions to Jain philosophy and Jainism in general.

 Indrabhuti Gautama
 Bhadrabahu, c. 4th century BCE. Last acharya of undivided Jain sangha.
 Kundakunda- 1st century BCE
 Sudharma Swami
 Umaswami- Author of the Jain text, Tattvarthsutra
Mantunga composer of Bhaktamara Stotra recognized by both, Digambar and Śvētāmbara.
Akalank ji

Digambara ascetics 

 Acharya Samantabhadra - Author of The Ratnakaranda śrāvakācāra, Āpta-mīmāṁsā, Svayambhustotra
 Akalanka, c. 8th century CE. Digambara acharya known for his works on Jain logic.
 Nemichandra Siddhant Chakravarti- Author of Gommatsāra
 Yativṛṣabha- Author of Tiloya Panatti
 Prabhācandra
 Virasena, Digambara, 790–825 CE
 Pujyapada
 Aparajita
 Aryanandi, 20th century Digambara acharya
 Vidyasagar, Digambara, Born 1946
 Ganeshprasad Varni, 1874–1961 CE. Digambara. Founder of many Jain Institutions.
 Ilango Adigal
 Jambu Swami
 Jambuvijaya
 Jinaratna
 Jinasena, Digambara, preceptor of the Rashtrakuta rulers, 800–880 CE.
 Jinendra Varni
 Gyansagar
 Kumudendu
 Manatunga composer of Bhaktamara Stotra
 Shantisagar, Digambara, 1872–1955
 Siddhasena Divakara, 5th century CE
 Acharya Deshbhushan- Jain Acharya of the 20th century
 Acharya Vidyananda - Acharya of the 20th Century
Tarunsagarji
Acharya Viraag sagar
Acharya Vishudh Sagar
 Adikavi Pampa - poet, one of the "three gems of Kannada literature".
Gyanmati

Śvētāmbara ascetics 
 Somadeva Suri
 
 Vallabhsuri
 Mahopadhya Yasovijayaji
 
 Ram Chandra Suri, Śvētāmbara, Samvat 1952–2047
 
 Anand Rishiji Maharaj
 Andayya - Kannada poet
 Haribhadra - 12th century philosopher
 Sthulabhadra
 Bhikshu, 1726–1803 CE. Creator of Terapanthi sect of Jainism.
 Vijayanandsuri - Guru of Acharya Vallabsuriji
 Haribhadra, c. 7th century CE. Śvētāmbara.
 Hemachandra, 1089–1172 CE. Śvētāmbara.
 Hiravijaya, Śvētāmbara; he influenced  
 Acharya Mahaprajna - Acharya of Terapanth sect
 Tulsi (Jain monk)
 Acharya Rajendrasuri - Acharya of the 20th century
 Acharya Mahasharman - 11th Acharya of Jain Swetamber Terapanth Community. 
 Acharya Vijay Vallabh suri
Acharya Vimalsagar - Acharya of the 20th century
Acharya Sushil Kumarji Maharaj

Other 
 Rajchandra
 Kanji Swami, founder of Kanji Panth sect of Digambara

Notes

References 

Monks